Richard M. Davidson (born 10 May 1940) is a Canadian-American actor and audiobook narrator.

Life and career
Davidson was born in Hamilton, Ontario and graduated from University of Toronto. He studied drama at Hart House Theatre in Toronto and made his professional acting stage debut under the name Michael Davidson in the production Coriolanus at Stratford Shakespeare Festival in Stratford in 1961. Subsequently, he left Canada and trained at the London Academy of Music and Dramatic Art. After graduation, he acted in various stage productions, including tour in Holland in "A Midsummer Night's Dream". He returned to Canada in 1966.

He has had a long-standing career in acting, appearing on radio, television and stage. Richard Davidson has narrated over 200 books.

Filmography

Film

Television

References

External links
Richard M. Davidson's Website

Richard M. Davidson at the Internet Broadway Database

1940 births
Living people
American male film actors
American male stage actors
American male television actors
Audiobook narrators
Canadian male film actors
Canadian male stage actors
Canadian male television actors
Male actors from Hamilton, Ontario